Apotomops rhampha is a species of moth of the family Tortricidae. It is found in Ecuador (Loja Province).

The wingspan is 20 mm. The ground colour of the forewings is white, strigulated with grey. The markings are brownish grey with blackish brown spots. The hindwings are whitish, mixed with cream brownish in the apical portion.

Etymology
The species name refers to the shape of the process of the sterigma and is derived from Greek rhamphos (meaning the beak of predaceous bird).

References

Moths described in 2008
Euliini
Moths of South America